Paris High School is a public high school serving students grades 9–12 located in the city of Paris, Lamar County, Texas, and is zoned to Paris and its immediate surroundings. It is one of the two high schools in the Paris Independent School District and is in UIL region 4A, In 2022, the school was rated "meets requirements" by the Texas Education Agency.

Athletics 
The Paris Wildcats compete in the following sports:

 Baseball
 Basketball
 Cross country
 Football
 Golf
 Powerlifting
 Softball
 Soccer
 Swimming
 Tennis
 Track and field
 Volleyball

State Championships 

 Football –
 1980 (4A)
 1988 (4A)

Notable people 

 Marsha Farney, a Republican member of the Texas House of Representatives for District 20 in Williamson County, is a former counselor at Paris High School

References

External links 

 Paris High School

Public high schools in Texas
High schools in Texas
Schools in Lamar County, Texas